Shu Jianming (born 16 June 1990 in Xichang, Sichuan) is a Chinese slalom canoeist who has competed since 2008. He finished 14th in the C1 event at the 2016 Summer Olympics in Rio de Janeiro.

References 

1990 births
Living people
People from Liangshan
Sportspeople from Sichuan
Olympic canoeists of China
Canoeists at the 2016 Summer Olympics
Chinese male canoeists